GMA Network (Global Media Arts or simply GMA) is a Philippine free-to-air television and radio network. It is the flagship property of publicly traded GMA Network, Inc. Its first broadcast on television was on October 29, 1961. GMA Network (formerly known as Republic Broadcasting System, GMA Radio-Television Arts and GMA Rainbow Satellite Network) is commonly referred to as the Kapuso Network in reference to the outline of the company's logo. It is headquartered in the GMA Network Center in Quezon City and its transmitter, Tower of Power, is located at Tandang Sora Avenue, Barangay Culiat also in Quezon City with regional stations and offices strategically located in over 9 major cities across the country.

The original meaning of the GMA acronym was Greater Manila Area, referring to the initial coverage area of the station. As the network expanded it changed into Global Media Arts. The flagship television station of GMA is DZBB-TV (GMA-7 Manila) which carries VHF Channel 7 (analog broadcast) with Channel 15 served as a permanent assigned digital frequency. The network operates across the Philippine archipelago through the GMA Regional TV department which has 7 originating stations and 46 relay stations nationwide. Its programming is also available outside the Philippines through the Philippine pay television channels GMA Pinoy TV, GMA Life TV and GMA News TV International which is available through satellite and cable TV systems worldwide. Since 2013, GMA has been testing digital terrestrial television broadcasts using the Japanese standard ISDB-T, in select areas in the Philippines.

History

1950s and 1960s
The origin of GMA Network can be traced back to Loreto F. de Hemedes Inc. through DZBB, which started airing its radio broadcast on March 1, 1950, and officially launched as a local radio station in Manila on June 14, 1950, and owned by Robert La Rue "Uncle Bob" Stewart, an American war correspondent. Venturing into television in the 1960s, Stewart started RBS TV Channel 7 (under the call letters DZBB-TV) on October 29, 1961, becoming the Philippines' fifth terrestrial television station. Originally, RBS's programming was composed of foreign programs from the United States and it later produced local programs to cater to Filipino audiences. It produced shows like Uncle Bob's Lucky Seven Club, a child-oriented show aired every Saturdays; Dance Time with Chito; and various news programs like News at Seven. In 1963, RBS launched its first provincial television station in Cebu, DYSS Channel 7 (now GMA Cebu). In the same year, from Loreto F. de Hemedes Inc, the firm was formally renamed to Republic Broadcasting System, Inc. (RBS).

1970s
On September 21, 1972, then President Ferdinand Marcos declared martial law by the virtue of Proclamation 1081. Marcos, ruling by decree, curtailed press freedom and other civil liberties; closed down the Congress and media establishments including RBS. In December 1972, RBS was given the green light by the government to return on the air, however with limited three-month permits. Programming during that time was supplied mostly via a blocktime agreement with Philippine Production Center Inc. (PPCI), a company led by former ABS-CBN executive Romeo Jalosjos. But due to limited licenses, difficulty in financial obligations, and disallowing foreign citizens and entities from owning and operating media companies in the Philippines, Stewart and the American Broadcasting Company, which owned 25% of the company, were forced to cede majority control to a triumvirate composed of Gilberto Duavit Sr., a Malacañang official; Menardo Jimenez, an accountant; and Felipe Gozon, an attorney of the Stewarts in 1974. The station changed its name to GMA Radio-Television Arts (GMA stood for Greater Manila Area, the station's initial coverage area) and retained its corporate name Republic Broadcasting System, Inc. (until 1996). Stewart's wife Loreto was the president when the takeover ensued. The relaunched GMA, aside from sporting a light blue square logo with the network name in white, also (until 1980) had a circle 7 logo in use, in its final years the blue circle 7 logo used was similar to those used by the ABC in some United States cities.

After that, Rod Reyes, then-general manager of RBS, recruited old-timers from ABS-CBN, including those from its news and entertainment divisions. After the Duavit-Jimenez-Gozon takeover, the station began to broadcast in color with an ₱8 million credit line thru buying telecine machines and acquired foreign programs. Ratings were up from #5 to #3 that time.

1980s
During martial law under the Marcos regime, GMA managed to broadcast the funeral of senator Ninoy Aquino, a public opposition leader who was assassinated in August 1983, the only local network to do so. In 1984, Imee Marcos, daughter of Ferdinand Marcos, attempted to take over GMA. However, the takeover was prevented by the network executives. Stewart left the country for good as a result. The network played an instrumental role during the years preceding the People Power Revolution. They were the first to air an interview with Corazon Aquino in 1984, as well as when she announced her intention to run for presidency once she receives one million signatures. During the People Power Revolution, the network was also the first to report that Fidel Ramos and Juan Ponce Enrile broke away from the Marcos administration. GMA's rival ABS-CBN reopened in September 1986 and convinced key people to transfer networks including Freddie M. Garcia along with key people from the network's Marketing and Engineering departments.

The People Power Revolution enabled previously closed down television stations to air again. However, the political instability during Aquino's term added burden to the network, most notably when it was stormed by rebel soldiers for two days as a part of an attempted coup against the Aquino administration. In 1987, the network broadcast its programs for the first time in full stereo, the first VHF television network to do so in the country.

1990s
In 1992, the Philippine Congress passed a law granting the network to operate for another 25 years. The network then targeted international reach in the 1990s. Through its relay stations, GMA programs were seen across the country as well as Southeast Asia. GMA programming started airing in 60 American cities and parts of South America through the International Channel Network.

GMA was selected to be the official broadcaster for the 1995 World Youth Day, when Pope John Paul II visited the country again. During the same year, popular TV shows Eat Bulaga! and Okay Ka, Fairy Ko! began broadcasting on GMA after TAPE Inc., the programs' production company, refused an ABS-CBN proposal to buy the airing rights of the two shows. Around the same time, the network launched a UHF channel subsidiary, Citynet 27, several new shows (including weekly late-night  show Bubble Gang), as well as the late night news program Saksi. The network also adapted the 700 Club series as The 700 Club Asia.

In 1995, GMA founded its film production company, Cinemax Studios (renamed to GMA Films in 1998) for the film Run Barbi Run. In 1998, the company produced the biopic film José Rizal, then the most expensive Filipino film produced, and had a successful run, garnering many accolades and nominations from award-giving bodies.

GMA formally changed its corporate name in 1996 to GMA Network Inc., with the acronym 'GMA' now standing for Global Media Arts. In 1999, GMA aired the Filipino language television news program GMA Network News, originally an English language newscast, then a rarity in Philippine television.

GMA was the first Philippine broadcaster to receive a Peabody Award for Investigative Reporting in 1999. Later, Citynet 27 became EMC, the first local music video-oriented TV channel, which became part of the short-lived Channel V franchise called Channel V Philippines. GMA broadcast the international millennium television special 2000 Today. The network then began airing 24-hour broadcasting until the National Telecommunications Commission (NTC) released and implemented a new set of rules and regulations with its affiliated free-to-air TV networks in 2001. Menardo Jimenez officially announced his retirement as president and CEO of the network in the same year, with Felipe Gozon assumed his office in concurrent capacity as the chairman of the network.

2000s
GMA officially revealed its present logo and image during an episode of its noontime show SOP on October 27, 2002. The following year, Saksi won a New York Television Festival Gold Medal for its newscast, the first Filipino news program to do so. This win, along with the Peabody Award in 1999, earned the network a commendation from the House of Representatives later that year. On September 1 of that same year, GMA withdrew its membership from the Kapisanan ng mga Brodkaster ng Pilipinas (KBP), after various issues and incidents involving its news talents and the cable firm Sky Cable's alleged distortion of GMA's signal on its system, among other factors.

2004 saw the debut of their several long-running television programs, among them the magazine show Kapuso Mo, Jessica Soho, as well as the award-winning documentary show Reporter's Notebook and its evening news program 24 Oras.

In 2005, subsidiary Citynet signed an agreement with ZOE Broadcasting Network. From 2005 to 2019, ZOE's flagship station DZOE-TV Channel 11, went on air as Quality TeleVision, and later reformatted as the GMA News TV and now known as GTV (currently on DWDB-TV Channel 27). The network planned to offer its initial public offering; however, the plan was delayed due to political instability during Arroyo's administration, among other factors. In 2007, the network announced its initial public offering after several setbacks.

In 2006, Debate with Mare at Pare, a late-night public affairs program, won the bronze medal at the New York Television Festival. The network was also praised for its coverage on the Wowowee stampede by local publications. An exclusive interview by Mike Enriquez to President Gloria Macapagal Arroyo after the lifting of the state of national emergency was allowed by GMA to be aired by other networks without prior consent, and was also similarly praised including the president herself. In April the same year, GMA founder Robert Stewart died while in the United States. The network supported and documented the successful attempt of mountain climber Romi Garduce to reach the summit of Mount Everest, only the third Filipino to do so.

The network started producing local adaptation of television franchises from other countries, starting from Celebrity Duets: Philippine Edition with FremantleMedia. They later produces local adaptations of the drama show Marimar, sci-fi show Zaido: Pulis Pangkalawakan, quiz show Kakasa Ka Ba sa Grade 5?, and game show Whammy! Push Your Luck. The network announced in 2007 that they would also adapt the Idol franchise. Since an earlier adaptation of the franchise was made by Associated Broadcasting Company (ABC) (under the name Philippine Idol), the new adaptation would be transferred to GMA under the new name Pinoy Idol.

In 2008 and 2009, GMA produced a diverse set of shows for its primetime block by airing several adaptations of Carlo J. Caparas and Mars Ravelo works, including Joaquin Bordado (2008), Dyesebel (2008) Ang Babaeng Hinugot sa Aking Tadyang (2009), Darna (2009), and Totoy Bato (2009), along with several original shows like Gagambino, Codename: Asero, Luna Mystika, among others. They also aired an adaptation of the Survivor franchise, titled Survivor Philippines, as well as a local Filipino adaptation of a Korean drama, titled Ako si Kim Samsoon. Their evening newscast 24 Oras received two awards in the New York Television Festival, a gold medal for Best Continuing Coverage and a silver medal for Best News Program.

2010s

In 2010, for the first and second quarters, GMA Network released new soaps and shows like The Last Prince, Panday Kids, First Time, Laff En Roll, Diva, Zooperstars, Claudine, Wipeout, Pepito Manaloto, Wachamakulit, Sunnyville, Comedy Bar, Love Bug, Langit sa Piling Mo, Pilyang Kerubin, Endless Love, Danz Showdown, as well as Diz Iz It! which replaced the longest morning talk show SiS along Party Pilipinas which replaced SOP and Koreana and Little Star which replaced Sine Novela marking the return of original concepts on their afternoon line-up.

In 2011, GMA Network offered an afternoon line-up which includes Nita Negrita, Magic Palayok, Alakdana, Sisid, My Lover, My Wife and Kung Aagawin Mo ang Langit. In the prime-time line-up, GMA released I Heart You, Pare!, Dwarfina, Machete, Captain Barbell, Munting Heredera, the first historical drama of the Philippines entitled Amaya and they offered the first TV remake drama series Ikaw Lang ang Mamahalin.

In 2012, the network offered a line-up of television series featuring original concepts for the first quarter, in both their primetime and afternoon blocks such as Legacy, Biritera and My Beloved on GMA Telebabad and Alice Bungisngis and her Wonder Walis, Broken Vow, The Good Daughter and Hiram na Puso on GMA Afternoon Prime.

On February 1, 2012, GMA Network announced it has signed a three-year deal with Fox International Channels which allows locally produced GMA's shows and feature films to be aired on FOX cable channels. The said deal covers a minimum of 350 hours' worth of programs and 25 feature films. Among the programs delivered to FOX for airing in its Philippine feed are: Encantadia, Darna, Dyesebel, Super Twins, Stairway to Heaven, Kaya Kong Abutin ang Langit, Trudis Liit and Babangon Ako't Dudurugin Kita, and news and public affairs shows like Wish Ko Lang, Pinoy Meets World and Pinoy Abroad. While the films covered by the deal are: My Best Friend's Girlfriend, When I Met U, Yaya and Angelina: The Spoiled Brat Movie, Temptation Island and José Rizal.

On February 22, 2012, GMA Films' President Annette Gozon-Abrogar and director Yam Laranas announced that the thriller movie The Road was commercially released and shown in over 50 theaters across North America and Canada on May 11, 2012, a first for a local Filipino motion picture.

On February 28, 2012, the network announced the retirement of senior vice president for the Entertainment Group, Wilma Galvante. The announcement came about after Galvante officially retired from the network, ending her 19 years of service as entertainment head. GMA Network appointed Lilybeth Rasonable as Officer-in-charge of the Entertainment Group. Rasonable has been with the network since 1998 and has served as program manager, assistant vice president, and vice president for drama for the Entertainment Group. Her latest position prior to the appointment has seen her supervising the group's afternoon and primetime teledramas.

In April 2012, GMA Network's president and COO Gilberto Duavit Jr. announced that the network hit consolidated revenues at 13.083 billion pesos in 2011. That's despite the absence of 2.054 billion pesos' worth of revenues from political ads generated in 2010 and the global impact of financial crisis in Europe and slow economic recovery in the U.S. in 2011.

On October 4, 2012, the network announced the termination of negotiations with MediaQuest Holdings, Inc. (an affiliate of Philippine Long Distance Telephone Company) owned by businessman and TV5 chairman Manny V. Pangilinan. Since the beginning of the year, Mr. Pangilinan had been vocal with his interest to acquire GMA Network, saying that he "talked to them, ... since 2002, and then maybe five years ago." Following the return of the negotiations of GMA Network to the PLDT Group, Manny V. Pangilinan confirming on March 4, 2014, that the offer to buy 34% stake at GMA Network was expired in February of the same year.

In 2013, GMA Network launched a new line-up of shows including Indio, Forever, Bukod Kang Pinagpala, Unforgettable, Vampire ang Daddy Ko, Mundo Mo'y Akin, Alisto, Love & Lies, Kakambal ni Eliana, Home Sweet Home, Maghihintay Pa Rin, My Husband's Lover, One Day Isang Araw, Sunday All Stars, Binoy Henyo, Akin Pa Rin ang Bukas, Dormitoryo, Prinsesa ng Buhay Ko, Kahit Nasaan Ka Man, Genesis, Katipunan, a remake of Villa Quintana, Bingit and Adarna.

On May 5, 2014, GMA Network chairman and CEO, attorney Felipe L. Gozon confirmed the networked has entered negotiations with San Miguel Corporation president and COO Ramon S. Ang. A month after, on June 24, 2014, GMA Network's major stockholders announced it will sell 30% of their equity shares of the network to Ang in his personal capacity. San Miguel Corporation is not involved in Ang's acquisition of the shares. In June 2015, GMA in a disclosure to the securities commission said that talks with Ramon Ang has bogged down. In that same year, the network won another Peabody Award for its coverage of Typhoon Haiyan (locally known as Supertyphoon Yolanda).

In April 2015, GMA Network implemented a series of budget cuts towards its regional TV stations, by terminating at least 200 regional employees, downgrading its originating TV stations in Bacolod, Naga, Cagayan de Oro, General Santos and Ilocos to 'satellite-selling' or relay TV stations, and cancelling morning shows in Cebu, Davao, Iloilo and Dagupan, reportedly in order for them to "streamline their operations for increased ratings and revenue". In November that same year, the network also downgraded its originating station in Iloilo City into 'relay-selling' or satellite TV station and cancelling Ratsada 24 Oras following the retrenchment of 20 employees from the news department as part of the strategic streamlining undertaken by GMA Network.

In 2016, GMA Network launched a new line-up of shows including Wish I May, That's My Amboy, Dear Uge, Lip Sync Battle Philippines, Hanggang Makita Kang Muli, The Millionaire's Wife, Poor Señorita, Yan ang Morning!, Once Again, Juan Happy Love Story, Magkaibang Mundo, Laff Camera Action, A1 Ko Sa 'Yo, Hay, Bahay!, Conan, My Beautician, a new version of Encantadia, Superstar Duets, Alyas Robin Hood, Hahamakin ang Lahat, Tsuperhero and Ika-6 na Utos.

On April 21, 2017, Philippine President Rodrigo Duterte signed Republic Act No. 10925 which renewed GMA Network's license for another 25 years. The law granted GMA Network a franchise to construct, install, operate, and maintain, for commercial purposes, radio broadcasting stations and television stations, including digital television system, with the corresponding facilities such as relay stations, throughout the Philippines.

On March 9, 2018, GMA Network launched its new slogan "Buong Puso Para Sa Kapuso" (lit. Wholehearted for the One in Heart) with a new station ID. However, the network's current station ID in short version during the top/bottom of the hour in different variants before start the programs as well as during commercial breaks/reminders it also aired on its sister channel, GMA News TV. On August 27, 2018, GMA regional stations in Iloilo and Bacolod were upgraded again to originating station as GMA Western Visayas following the launch of the new regional news program One Western Visayas.

On December 14, 2018, GMA Network's founding chairman Atty. Gilberto M. Duavit Sr. died at the age of 84. He was GMA Network's chairman from 1974 to 1976 and sat as one of the network's board of directors in 1977. He rejoined the network's board of directors in 2016 until the time of his death.

On February 22, 2019, the network has announced that they will be investing ₱1 billion for the second phase of their digitization project.

2020s
On January 1, 2020, GMA Network began the celebration of its 70th anniversary and its flagship international channel GMA Pinoy TV also began the celebration of its 15th anniversary with a variation of its current slogan: Buong Puso Para sa Pilipino (as GMA Network) and Buong Puso Para sa Kapuso Abroad (as GMA Pinoy TV). Along with their anniversary celebration, a new program lineup for 2020 was revealed, which was started by All-Out Sundays, Descendants of the Sun, the remake of the 1984 Philippine film Anak ni Waray vs. Anak ni Biday, Love of My Life, Saturday edition of Wowowin (also dubbed as Wowowin Primetime), Centerstage, Ilaban Natin 'Yan! (which was first known as "Doon Tayo Sa Tama"), and the remake of 1989 film Bilangin ang Bituin sa Langit. Alongside, they also revealed future programs such as Alamat ng Agimat, First Yaya, Sanggang Dikit, Legal Wives, Babawiin Ang Lahat (retitled as Babawiin Ko ang Lahat in 2021), Seed of Love, Lolong, Owe My Love, Taiwan and Only, Sing 4 Hearts and Catch Me Out Philippines.

On March 14, 2020, GMA Network announced the suspension of production of current programs, especially its live shows, due to President Rodrigo Duterte implementing an enhanced community quarantine in Metro Manila and Luzon in line with restrictions due to the COVID-19 pandemic in the Philippines. Thus, the network aired reruns of some drama series, including Encantadia, Kambal, Karibal, Ika-6 na Utos, My Husband's Lover, Onanay and Alyas Robin Hood.

On August 24, 2020, GMA Network resumed production of current programs. 

On April 5, 2022, GMA Network announced a deal with ABS-CBN Corporation that would allow Star Cinema films to air on GMA's local channels. On November 11, 2022, GMA Network announced a collaboration with ABS-CBN and Dreamscape Entertainment for a new drama series in 2023.

On February 24, 2023, GMA Network announced that starting February 27, 2023, the main channel  alongside with their sister channel, GTV (owned by Citynet Network Marketing and Productions Inc., a wholly owned subsidiary of GMA Network Inc.), as well as four free-to-air GMA Affordabox digital subchannels (Heart of Asia, Hallypop, I Heart Movies and Pinoy Hits) and three pay TV international channels (GMA Pinoy TV and GMA Life TV and GMA News TV International) are set to switch its airing of aspect ratio format quality on the channel feed and its programming to Anamorphic widescreen ratio format (16:9) as being converted its mitigation of reception through analog (until end of the year) and digital signal reception through free TV and other cable and satellite providers after more than 61 years on the usage of broadcast video picture resolution that migrated from standard-definition format (4:3).

Digital terrestrial television
In February 2013, GMA Network admitted that it was conducting field tests of Integrated Services Digital Broadcasting-Terrestrial (ISDB-T), the Japanese standard in digital television on UHF Channel 27 (551.143 MHz), but remained unconvinced of ISDB-T, saying that the European standard, second-generation Digital Video Broadcasting-Terrestrial (DVB-T2), is superior to ISDB-T. However, in October 2013, National Telecommunications Commission (NTC) issued a draft memorandum circular adopting the Japanese standard as the sole standard in the delivery of digital terrestrial TV (DTT) services in the Philippines. In May 2015, GMA Network announced that it will be spending at least ₱2 to 3 billion for the rollout of its digital TV service and said the company plans to produce dongles, instead of set-top boxes for the rollout. In May 2015, GMA topped the digital TV test commissioned by mobile phone brand Starmobile and conducted by American market research firm International Data Corporation (IDC) with GMA's presence in 10 out of 14 locations in Metro Manila.

Beginning September 2013, some of the programs of the network have been produced in high-definition format in preparation for the ongoing digital shift in the country while keeping digital on-screen graphics in 4:3 safe zone for their TV broadcast since the network is still broadcasting in 480i. The videos uploaded on their YouTube channel and third-party OTT services on the other hand are presented in 720p and 1080p format. GMA Playground is an extension of the digital terrestrial television format of the GMA Network.

In December 2016, it was announced that the network will spend an initial amount of ₱416 million for the commencement of the Digital Terrestrial Television transition project of GMA, which included the purchase of three high-powered transmitters capable for providing wider and clearer signal to digital television boxes, antennae and other connectivity requirements, and a fully mirrored head-end system, which is a master facility for grouping and digitally encoding programs. According to GMA Network Chairman and CEO, Felipe Gozon, the network will conclude the test phase, and it is expected to begin the rollout of the DTTV project starting in Metro Manila.

In preparation for the shift to digital, GMA New Media was working on a DTV set-top box (originally reported to be a DTV dongle) in order to compete with ABS-CBN's TV Plus set-top box. A prototype was shown at the IMMAP DigiCon congress in 2016, and is shown to be running a version of Android, double-acting as a streaming device capable of running apps and games. In June 2020, images of a DTV set-top box known as the GMA Affordabox surfaced online. The product is said to be priced at under ₱1000 and includes a multimedia player, a personal video recorder, and support for the Philippines' emergency broadcast warning system with an auto-on alert feature. The GMA Affordabox became available on Lazada and Shopee that same month with a final price tag of ₱888. On December 12, 2020, a DTV mobile dongle which designed for USB OTG-capable Android smartphones known as GMA Now was released on Lazada and Shopee, it costs ₱649 and it also has a video on demand feature to access GMA's exclusive online contents, a web chat (Groupee Chat), and interactive games, which requires internet connection for these extra features.

On February 22, 2019, GMA Network announced that they will be investing ₱1 billion for the second phase of its digitization project. On May 15, 2019, GMA Network began to transmit its digital test broadcast on UHF Channel 15 (479.143 MHz) as its permanent frequency assigned by National Telecommunications Commission.

Ownership structure
GMA Network is jointly owned by its three major shareholders; the Gozon, Duavit and Jimenez families. Its corporate shareholding is owned by Group Management & Development Inc. (27.05%), FLG Management & Development Corp. (23.33%), M.A. Jimenez Enterprises (15.55%), GMA Holdings Inc. (14.81%), and Television International Corp. (11.45%).

Shareholder GMA Holdings, Inc. is jointly owned by Felipe L. Gozon, Gilberto Duavit, Jr., and Joel Marcelo Jimenez.

Branding

Network identity
On October 29, 1961, Loreto F. de Hemedes Inc. launches its first television station in the Philippines, known back then as RBS TV Channel 7. GMA Network began branding its identity by eliminating call signs to its network identification.

RBS TV Channel 7 (1961–1974) – From the success of its amplitude modulation band radio DZBB, Robert La Rue "Uncle Bob" Stewart launches its first television and the Philippines' fifth terrestrial channel, RBS TV Channel 7.
 GMA Radio-Television Arts (1974–1992) – To ascertain its presence in its coverage area, the Greater Manila Area, RBS changed its name to GMA Radio-Television Arts after the takeover by the new management.
 GMA Rainbow Satellite Network (Rainbow Network, 1992–1995) – When the network launched its satellite to widen its coverage area, GMA again rebranded its network identity on April 26, 1992.
 GMA Network (Rainbow Network, 1995–2002) – In preparation for the 45th year of responsible broadcasting, GMA Rainbow Satellite was simplified to GMA Network.
 GMA Network (Kapuso Network, 2002–present) – On October 27, 2002, GMA Network unveiled its new identity and catchphrase. In an effort to localize and transform its image into a more intrinsic Filipino network, GMA Network engaged in a rebranding course.

Logos
GMA Network has used a number of logos throughout its history especially when Gozon, Jimenez, and Duavit acquired the station in 1975. From the late 1970s to the early 1990s, the network used the Circle 7 logo for its Metro Manila and Cebu stations, which is also expended by several networks around the world (predominately the O&O stations of ABC in the United States). In the 1980s, to refine its presence in the Philippine broadcast industry, GMA Network used the slogan "Where You Belong", and lasted for two decades before invigorating to another catchphrase. In 1992, GMA Network redefines itself as the Rainbow Network, succeeding the ensigns of the rainbow. Throughout the 1990s, the network developed the logo before having it replaced by its current logo in 2002 and as the Kapuso Network. After a huge marketing campaign, and improved television ratings, the new insignia (the rainbow-colored stylized heart-shape logo known as "Kapuso") is now one of the most recognizable in the Philippines.

Slogans
"Kapuso ng Bawat Pilipino" ("One in Heart with Every Filipino") is the secondary characteristic catchphrase of GMA Network. The slogan was initially used in conjunction with the rebranding of GMA Network as the Kapuso Network on October 27, 2002. (Currently, it is used in its Regional TV stations). But another slogan of the network "Kapuso, Anumang Kulay ng Buhay" ("One in Heart, in Every Colors of Life") is still used in other purposes and this is the official theme song title for the network. GMA Network's news and public affairs department meanwhile uses the slogan "Serbisyong Totoo"  ("True Service") It is one of the longest running slogans used for news broadcast promotion. GMA Network found itself on the other end of a battle concerning the slogan, when ABS-CBN News Channel uses similar catchphrase, and immediately discontinued in order to avoid legal predicament from GMA Network. In 2006, its news department also used an accompanying slogan, "Just News", for its promotional campaign together with its news media partners, INQ7.Net. In 2018, the network introduced a new corporate slogan, "Buong Puso Para Sa Kapuso"  ("Wholehearted for the One in Heart") which presented GMA's effort to bring programs, relevant shows, multi-awarded newscasts and documentaries and other services through TV, radio and online format from its birth to the present time, from the Philippines and abroad. In 2020, a variation of the current slogan "Buong Puso Para Sa Pilipino"  ("Wholehearted for the Filipino") was unveiled on its 70th anniversary (currently used as a secondary slogan for its original 2018 slogan). It is currently shown on programming promo plugs of the network on TV and its Social Media channels, and "Buong Puso Para Sa Pinoy Abroad"  ("Wholehearted for the Filipino Abroad") for celebrating GMA Pinoy TV's 15th anniversary.

Programming

GMA Network television programming comprises news and public affairs, local dramas and soap operas, anime series, variety and musical shows, foreign cartoons, children's shows, talk shows, reality programs, sports, and film presentations. Most of the programs are broadcast live and taped in its GMA Network Centers and Studios located in Metropolitan Manila. GMA Network currently programs 20.5 hours of programming per day. It provides 34.5 hours of prime-time programming per week to its owned and affiliated stations: on Weekdays, 4:00–10:00 p.m. on Mondays to Thursdays, 10:00 p.m.–1:00 a.m. on Fridays, 10:00 p.m.–1:00 a.m. on Saturdays, 4:30 p.m.–1:30 a.m. on Sundays. Programming is also provided from 4:00 p.m.–2:40 a.m. on Weekdays in the form of Unang Hirit; the two-and-half-hour and three-hour Monday to Saturday noontime variety show Eat Bulaga!, early-afternoon drama (Afternoon Prime block), early and late-evening news programs (24 Oras and Saksi respectively); primetime programming through its Telebabad block; late-night current affairs show produced by its news and public affairs department.

Competition
Programming competition started in 2004 when production of numerous GMA Network shows was up against its rival network, ABS-CBN. Reality show Extra Challenge started to lead the ratings and with launch of "telefantasya" Mulawin. On September 23, 2004, GMA Network gained leadership in Mega Manila against its closest competitor. In 2005, GMA Network began producing Mars Ravelo's Darna, a classic Filipino comic book character which became a hit, with an overnight rating of 47.7 percent, the highest rating for a pilot episode and the first "telefantasya" to reach 52.1 percent ratings; followed by Encantadia at 47.2 percent and other prime-time "telefantasyas", Mulawin (2004) and Sugo (2005) contributed to GMA Network lead in Mega Manila. In 2006, GMA Network maintained its prime time supremacy by reformatting its reality-based program Extra Challenge and another "telefantasya" Encantadia (which was succeeded by Etheria and Encantadia: Pag-ibig Hanggang Wakas), and the localized subtitled versions of Korean television series Stairway to Heaven, Full House, Jewel in the Palace and My Lovely Sam Soon.

In 2007, GMA Network started producing the local version of a Mexican television series MariMar. For its pilot episode, it got 52.6 percent overnight rating, making it the only soap opera to achieve the highest ratings in GMA Network's history. In a 2006 survey conducted by Pulse Asia, seven out of 10 Metro Manila-based viewers find GMA Network a more credible network than its competitor. GMA Network managed to lead in Mega Manila and Southern Luzon demographic, which has the highest concentration of television ownership and 79 percent of advertisement placement.

The National Urban Television Audience Measurement was officially launched on October 16, 2006, to determine the television ratings and the audience share of local TV programs from urban areas in the Philippines. This changes the broadcast industry landscape and the manner in which the advertisers allocate their TV investments to achieve cost efficiency and maximization. In August 2007 audience rating data shows GMA Network maintained its lead in Mega Manila, which resulted to a 23 percent growth in its consolidated net income to ₱1.13 billion in the first half of the year from ₱915 million in the same period last year. GMA Network income grew by 23 percent year-on-year to ₱1.126 billion in the first six months of the year. Mega Manila accounts 49 percent of total TV households. The Mega Manila and Luzon markets combined accounts for 76 percent of the total TV households. It earned ₱2.3 billion in 2007. In 2011, GMA Network maintained the lead in the national television ratings mentioning figures from Nielsen TV Audience Measurement for January 1 to February 13, 2011. It had 33.2 percent audience shared based on overnight data, higher than ABS-CBN's 31.8 percent and TV5's 14.9 percent. It also leads in Urban Luzon, which makes up 77 percent of total television households in the Philippines. GMA Network posted 9.8 point lead with 36.5 points compared with the closest competitor, ABS-CBN's 26.7 points and imposing a 19.6 point lead from TV5's 16.9. GMA Network also sustained to beat ABS-CBN in Mega Manila, which accounts for 58 percent of television household. It got 37.7 percent share over ABS-CBN 25.2 percent and TV5's 17.7 percent, 20 points higher.

Controversies

Copyright infringement with ABS-CBN
On July 22, 2004, during the arrival of Angelo de la Cruz at Ninoy Aquino International Airport (a truck driver who was held hostage and threatened with beheading in Iraq abducted by armed rebels west of Baghdad while trucking fuel from Saudi Arabia), live news coverage was aired on GMA Network and other local television stations in the Philippines. GMA Network used audio-video coverage through the facilities of Reuters, which GMA Network subscribed to. During the said broadcast, a live feed from Reuters was simultaneously aired with its own live broadcast. During the first five-second of the live feed, GMA Network did notice that the live feed from Reuters was also airing at another local station, its main competitor ABS-CBN. The live video was restricted only to ABS-CBN and Reuters did not inform GMA Network that the video coverage was only intended for ABS-CBN. The local Court of Appeals junked the case filed by ABS-CBN Corporation against GMA Network Inc. for what was claimed to be illegal copying of its live video footage. In a ruling, the local fourth division of the appellate court set aside the resolution of the local Justice Department, which approved the filing of the violation of Republic Act 8293 (or the Intellectual Property Code) against GMA Network. It ruled out that the act of GMA Network in airing the live video coverage was focused by good faith since there was no meaning to instigate damage to ABS-CBN Corporation. The local court also said GMA Network acted in good faith when it decided to instantaneously stop using the live video feed from Reuters upon learning ABS-CBN was also covering the said news event and its following exertion to authenticate the ABS-CBN Corporation restriction arrangement with the news service, Reuters. The local court also stressed that apart from lack of intent of GMA Network to affect the video from ABS-CBN, the action also cannot be reflected intrusion of Sections 212.4 and 185.1 of Republic Act 8293 since it was just a short excerpt compared with the totality of the matter.

TV ratings

On December 20, 2007, Judge Charito Gonzales of Quezon City Regional Trial Court Branch 80 released a temporary restraining order on TV ratings surveys based on a civil case filed by then ABS-CBN Broadcasting Corporation (now ABS-CBN Corporation) versus AGB Nielsen Media Research Philippines. ABS-CBN Broadcasting Corporation accused competitor GMA Network Inc. of funding bribing operations in Bacolod City, to discredit the former. The local court in the Philippines further ordered ABS-CBN Broadcasting Corporation to file comment on the plea of AGB Nielsen Media Research Philippines for the alleged gathering and dissemination of television ratings data, within five days or until December 22, 2007. On December 21, 2007, a local AM radio station in the Philippines, owned by ABS-CBN Broadcasting Corporation, DZMM field reporter Junrie Hidalgo reported a news story entitled "AGB Nielsen, umamin sa dayaan: GMA Network, tahasang itinurong nasa likod ng dayaan" ("AGB Nielsen admits to cheating: GMA Network aggressively accused of being behind the cheating") during the radio program of Showbiz Mismo, hosted by Cristy Fermin and Jobert Sucaldito. The news story is based on an interview of AGB Nielsen general manager Maya Reforma regarding the purported cheating. In response, GMA Network Inc. aired a television plug reproving the purported unfair journalism and disagreed the accusations of ABS-CBN Broadcasting Corporation. GMA Network Inc. later filed a ₱15 million civil libel suit against ABS-CBN Broadcasting Corporation on January 3, 2008. The respondents included Hidalgo, Fermin, Sucaldito, the station and news manager of DZMM, writers and executive producers of television programs Bandila, Entertainment Live and The Buzz after the same story was aired locally. On January 7, 2008, the Quezon City Regional Trial Court junked ABS-CBN Broadcasting Corporation's suit against AGB Nielsen, saying the case was "prematurely filed" before the local court. Judge Gonzales' basis is the principle of mutuality of contracts, citing Article 1308 and 1196, New Civil Code of the Philippines. Also, Judge Samuel Gaerlan, Quezon City Regional Trial Court Branch 92 issued court summons against ABS-CBN Broadcasting Corporation and 15 of its personnel on January 3, 2008. On January 17, 2008, Judge Gaerlan recused himself from the case, considering that he has a cousin working in the legal department of ABS-CBN Broadcasting Corporation. The case was later re-raffled on January 28, 2008, and the case was eventually assigned to Judge Henri Inting of Branch 95 of the Quezon City Regional Trial Court. On February 14, 2008, Judge Inting issued a temporary restraining order barring local television station, ABS-CBN from airing defamatory statements against GMA Network Inc.

Lawsuit against TV5
In December 2008, GMA Network Inc., Citynet Television, and ZOE Broadcasting Network filed a lawsuit against the management of TV5, alleging MPB Primedia Inc. (a subsidiary of Media Prima Berhad, a Malaysian company, which entered a block time agreement with Associated Broadcasting Company to sell the airtime of TV5) of violating Article XVI, Section 3, of the 1987 Philippine Constitution. GMA Network Inc. argues restriction of foreign entities to operate and own a Filipino company especially on broadcast media. GMA Network Inc. disputes MPB Primedia Inc. that it was established to skirt the anti-dummy laws and enter into an unlawful block time deal.

References

External links
Media Ownership Monitor Philippines - Television by VERA Files and Reporters Without Borders

 
Television networks in the Philippines
Television in Metro Manila
Mass media companies of the Philippines
Digital terrestrial television in the Philippines
Peabody Award winners
1950 establishments in the Philippines
Television channels and stations established in 1961
Mass media companies established in 1950
Companies based in Quezon City
Filipino-language television stations
GMA Network (company) channels